Miners of Muzo are a Dutch-based rock band that started out in 1983, founded in the city of Tilburg by singer and songwriter Leon Lemmen.

History

The band name was picked out of a short list of names without further meaning (It was also the name of a BBC documentary on the outlaw emerald miners of the Colombian city Muzo).
Pretty much bored of what was going on musically back then, they chose to seek the gut feeling of rock music again. Anti- shoe gazing rock music with lots of electric guitar and organ. On the first album The Birthday Party influences are still evident, but as from the second album APOGEE, the style becomes more melodic and very 60's influenced.
In 10 years time 7 albums and 5 singles were released and numerous gigs and tours through the Netherlands, Belgium, Germany, Switzerland and especially France had followed. They were also the first Dutch rock band to play at SXSW in Austin Texas in 1990.

At the end of the 90s the Miners paused. Feeling it was time for a break. Keyboard player Dan was no longer in the band and lives in Amsterdam. Marc had been playing with American singer Pat Mears but returned to the band in 95. For a while they called themselves Funrazor to see if it was possible to start with a clean slate without any legacy. But then after 2 years they returned to the original name again and started to build a recording studio in their own rehearsal garage.  When the studio became better equipped new songs were recorded and the songs from those years are captured in a double CD "Love & Life part II" which is only available as a download on their website.

Hans left the country shortly after that and has a new life as a farmer in France. Since 2010 The Miners started playing live again occasionally and they were joined by guitarist Wannes Rombouts and drummer Kasper Dam. The long-awaited new album: "Really...is that a fact" has been self-released as a promo in January 2013.

Early December 2013 original drummer GJ suffered a fatal heart attack and died sadly. Due to lack of time and other obligations, Wannes Rombouts is no longer active with the Miners. At the same time Miners of Muzo is playing again as HOLY JOE & the ALCOHOLITES, an alter ego band about Joe the Rock'n Roll Bishop. A band which only plays 60s garage songs, mainly covers (something they always have been doing  alongside the Miners material). Lead guitar is played by 19 year old Frankie Lamberts aka Frankie Fuzz.

In 2017 Hans Vroom returned to pick up the guitar again. In the summer of 2017 The Miners of Muzo (reunited with Hans on guitar) played a few concerts in the South of France. In 2018 The Miners played at The Go Wild festival and at the Down at the Nightclub festival.

In 2017 the Miners of Muzo resumed recording new material. In 2017 The Miners of Muzo appeared on the compilation album Down at the Nightclub vol.1 and released two CDs, Really is that a Fact and Love & Life Part II. In 2018 The Miners appeared on Down at the Nightclub vol.2 where they provided the vinyl only bonus title track "Down at the Nightclub".

In 2022 guitarist Hans appeared as a participant of the Dutch RTL 4 show “ B&B vol Liefde” where he , as a single guy with a B&B abroad, has to look for and find a new love, a new partner (Similar to Farmer Wants a Wife, or the French L’Amour est dans le pré, but then only with single B&B owners).
The Miners of Muzo made an appearance in episode 18 and played live on the village square of Dégangac, where Hans lives and has his B&B and his equestrian center Du Passe Temps. Hence Miners of Muzo played more shows in 2022 both in the Netherlands and France and released a new 7” single on vinyl together with Parisian friends, the band #Whodunit. This was a split single with Jaques Dutronc covers by both bands. Miners of Muzo played  "On nous cache tout, on nous dit rien" and Whodunit "Les Playboys".

Current members
Leon Lemmen – vocals/guitars
Marc Lemmen – Bass guitar
Hans Vroom – Guitar
Kasper Dam (Kazzman) – Drums

Discography
In Surf of Fish — Eksakt Records [Mini LP] 1983
Apogee — Eksakt Records –LP 1984
Hey Gypsy Woman — Eksakt Records [7"] 1984
Beauty is Pain — Eksakt Records, G.M.G France, Music Box Greece [LP] 1986
Dig Deep For... — Eksakt Records, Ediesta UK [LP] 1987
Make My Day — Eksakt Records, Music Maniac Germany [LP] 1988
Sandman — Eksakt Records [7"] 1988
Make My Day (has 6 bonus tracks from "Beauty is Pain") Music Maniac Germany [CD] 1989
Hey Gypsy Woman — Spliff France [7"] 1989
Are You There — Silenz/Columbus [Mini CD/MC] 1990
Love & Live Storybook — Silenz [LP/MC/CD] 1990
No One — Silenz [7"] 1990
Robin & Mary Ann — Silenz [CD single] 1990
Beauty Queen of Beach Rock City — Silenz [CD single]1990
About Time — (Anthology) Music Maniac Germany [CD] 1993
Love & Life part II (diggin' the Future) 1997-2007 — Double album, only available as a download from minersofmuzo.com [MP3] 2011
Really... is that a Fact? — MoM Productions self-release promo [CD] 2012-2013
Love & Life part II official release; Down at the Nightclub Records [2CD] 2017
Really... is that a Fact? official release; Down at the Nightclub Records [CD] 2017
Down at the Nightclub vol.1 - 2 songs Down at the Nightclub Records [12" Vinyl] 2017
Down at the Nightclub vol.2 Down at the Nightclub vol.2 - vinyl bonus track "Down at the Nightclub" Down at the Nightclub Records [12" Vinyl] 2018
On Nous Cache Tout, On Nous Dit Rien - Down at the Nightclub Records [7" vinyl] 2022

Line Ups
The first line up in the early beginning
Leon Lemmen— Lead vocals and bass guitar
Hans Vroom— Lead guitar and vocals
Daan Appels— Saxophone, percussion, keyboards and vocals
Ruud Diederiks— Drums
Monique van Dusseldorp— Keyboards

Second Line up (first album In Surf of Fish )
Leon Lemmen— Lead vocals, bass guitar, guitar
Hans Vroom— Lead guitar and vocals
Daan Appels— Keyboards, Saxophone, percussion, and vocals
Marc Van Gennip— Drums

Third Line up (second album APOGEE)
Leon Lemmen— Lead vocals, bass guitar, guitar
Hans Vroom— Lead guitar and vocals
Daan Appels— Keyboards, Saxophone, percussion, and vocals
Gert Jan Smits— Drums

Fourth Line up (since 3rd album Beauty is Pain)
Leon Lemmen— Lead vocals, guitar
Hans Vroom— Lead guitar and vocals
Daan Appels— Keyboards, and vocals
Gert Jan Smits— Drums
Marc Lemmen— Bass guitar

Fifth Line up
Leon Lemmen— Lead vocals, guitar
Wannes Rombouts— Lead guitar and vocals
Gert Jan Smits— Drums
Marc Lemmen— Bass guitar

Sixth Line up
Leon Lemmen— Lead vocals, guitar
Wannes Rombouts— Lead guitar and vocals
Kasper Dam— Drums
Marc Lemmen— Bass guitar

Seventh Line up
Leon Lemmen— Lead vocals, guitar
Hans Vrooms— Lead guitar and vocals
Kasper Dam— Drums
Marc Lemmen— Bass guitar

External links

 Miners of Muzo website
Miners of Muzo Facebook page
Miners of Muzo MySpace page
The Miners of Muzo on Discogs

Dutch rock music groups